The North Battleford Access Communications Centre, formerly known as the Civic Centre, is a 2,500-seat multi-purpose arena in North Battleford, Saskatchewan built in 1962. It is home to the Battlefords North Stars ice hockey team. It is also home to the North Battleford Kinsmen Indoor Rodeo, held annually every April.

References

Indoor arenas in Saskatchewan
Indoor ice hockey venues in Canada
North Battleford
Sports venues in Saskatchewan
Sports venues completed in 1962
1962 establishments in Saskatchewan
Rodeo venues in Canada